Octavia Yati (born 20 October 1954 in Jakarta, Indonesia) is an Indonesian actress. She mainly plays in dramas and romantic films.

Yati is married and has four sons, one from a previous marriage.

She started her film career at a very young age. One of Yati's earliest roles was Brandal – Brandal Metropolitan. In 1977 she played in the movies Akibat Pergaulan Bebas and Ali Topan Anak Jalanan. Yati was one of the best-paid actresses of her time, earning Rp5 million.

Filmography
 Noda dan Asmara
 Cinta Putih
 Pengalaman Pertama
 Akibat Bercinta
 Aula Cinta
 Roda roda Gila
 Sentuhan Cinta
 Widuri Kekasihku
 Rintihan Gadis Buta
 Rahasia Perkawinan
 Akibat Godaan
 Gadis Simpanan
 Gara gara Istri Muda
 Dari Mata Turun Ke Hati
 Benci Tapi Rindu
 Perjalanan Cinta
 Oma Irama Gitar Tua
 Oma Irama "Begadang"
 Oma Irama "Berkelana"
 Oma Irama "Penasaran"
 Darah Muda
 Pengorbanan
 Hamidah
 Cinta Fitri (film) 1–6 as Fitri Rahayu
 Cintaku Dikampus Biru
 Rahasia Perawan
 Intan Perawan Kubu
 Sidoel Anak Modern

References

1954 births
Living people
Indonesian film actresses
Indonesian television actresses
Actresses from Jakarta
20th-century Indonesian actresses
21st-century Indonesian actresses